1969 – Siempre, En Vivo Desde Monterrey, Parte 2 is a live album by Regional Mexican singer Jenni Rivera, released in 2014. It is Part 2 of a trilogy recording of her final concert in Monterrey, Nuevo León, Mexico, just three hours before her death.

Reviews 
"Recorded just hours before an airplane crash would take her life, 1969: Siempre, En Vivo Desde Monterrey, Pt. 2 captures Jenni Rivera's last concert, a show in Monterrey, Mexico on December 8, 2012. The singer's die-hard fans will appreciate owning this fiery, passionate bit of history, and the performances are top-notch, but unlike Pt. 1, which featured some soundboard recordings, the audio quality here is rough all around, sourced from the audience. It sounds cavernous and often distorts when the volume swells, but with no other recordings of the show available, fans will have to decide whether to deal with this document or pass." -Allmusic

Track listing

Charts

Weekly charts

Year-end charts

Awards and nominations

See also 
 List of number-one Billboard Latin Albums from the 2010s

References 

2014 live albums
Jenni Rivera live albums
Fonovisa Records live albums
Spanish-language live albums